"Want You Bad" is a song by American punk rock band the Offspring. The song is featured as the fourth track on the band's sixth studio album, Conspiracy of One (2000), and was released as its second single. The song is also featured on the band's Greatest Hits album (2005). It became another Offspring US Hot Modern Rock Track top 10.

The title is a play on words, with the narrator of the song saying to his girlfriend he wants her "to be bad" as in a dominatrix way, rather than he wants her "badly".

The song was remixed by the Dwarves singer Blag Dahlia. The remix appeared on some versions of the "Million Miles Away" single. Two of the single's B-sides, "80 Times" and "Autonomy", appeared on the band's 2010 Japan only compilation album Happy Hour!.

Music video
The music video was filmed in Los Angeles, California, during January 10–11, 2001, and was directed by Spencer Susser. It takes place at a party, with the band playing in the background. The protagonist is a man trying it on with various women in attendance, failing each time. Soon, the partygoers start to open up cans with the Offspring logo on them. These explode violently with foam when opened leading to the party starting to get chaotic.

Eventually the man finds a woman who does not balk at his whispered suggestions. Meanwhile, the party has descended into chaos as the foam covers even the band and some of them are tackled to the ground by the partiers, though the music still plays. In the closing moments of the video, the woman is shown shaking one of the Offspring cans in front of the man. The man looks on excited as it finally explodes - the foam appears to blow his head off while the woman laughs and smiles as the camera fades to black.

Dexter Holland, the band's lead vocalist, said he hated this video, saying that it was too "cheesy", although it is one of his favorite songs.

The first model (in a black bikini) was played (supposedly) by Kim Smith, the second model (in a red dress) is Michelle Belegrin and the third model is Katelyn Rosaasen. The music video appears on the Complete Music Video Collection DVD, released in 2005.

Track listings
Version 1

Version 2

Version 3

Charts and certifications

Weekly charts

Year-end charts

Certifications

In popular culture
The song was the opening song to the 2001 film Tomcats.
The song was featured in the 2001 comedy film American Pie 2.
The song was featured in the video game Crazy Taxi 3: High Roller.

References

External links

The Offspring songs
2000 singles
Songs written by Dexter Holland
Song recordings produced by Brendan O'Brien (record producer)
2000 songs
Columbia Records singles
Songs about BDSM